Pockwock is one of four Black Nova Scotian settlements in Upper Hammonds Plains. People in this area are mostly descendants of War of 1812 refugees. It is located in the Halifax Regional Municipality in the Canadian province of Nova Scotia. The Halifax Regional Water Commission uses Pockwock Lake as a source for water for the communities of Halifax, Bedford and Lower Sackville.

Climate

References

External links
Explore HRM
Pockwock
The Pockwock-Bowater Watershed

Communities in Halifax, Nova Scotia
General Service Areas in Nova Scotia